Francisco de Arango y Parreño (1765-1837) was a Cuban planter and intellectual.  He helped to oversee Spanish-ruled colonial Cuba's transformation into a major sugar and coffee producer in last decades of the eighteenth century and the first decades of the nineteenth.

Arango y Parreño was born into a bourgeois Criollo Cuban family on May 22, 1765, in Havana, Cuba.  He studied at the Real Colegio Seminario de San Carlos y San Ambrosio.  Later, in the 1780s, he studied at the University of San Jeronimo.  In 1787 he travelled to Madrid, Spain, where he continued his legal studies. By 1789 he had obtained a law degree.

The outbreak of the French Revolution and the subsequent Haitian Revolution (1791-1804) opened up new possibilities for Cuban planters.  Before the second half of the eighteenth century, Cuba's agriculture had been fairly backward.  The island's economy centered on small tobacco farms and ranching.  A series of events, however, helped to transform Cuba into a major plantation colony over the course of the second half of the eighteenth century.

Britain occupied Havana in the 1760s and introduced large numbers of slaves during their relatively short occupation- at the time Britain was the biggest slave trading power in the Caribbean region.  Soon after the British occupation ended, the Bourbon Spanish monarchy instituted liberalizing reforms that gave Cuba more access to imported African slaves and foreign commerce.  Finally, the Haitian Revolution destroyed what had been the world's largest sugar and coffee producer in the 1790s.  This meant that sugar and coffee prices rose significantly.  Refugees from Saint-Domingue/Haiti also fled to Cuba, bringing slaves and experience in the sugar and coffee industries with them.  Some feared that the introduction of large numbers of enslaved Africans might lead to a revolution like the one that occurred in Saint-Domingue/Haiti.  Arango y Parreno, however, argued that a slave rebellion that the one in Saint-Domingue would not occur in Cuba because Spanish slave laws were more enlightened than those of the French and British (Palmié and Scarano, p. 338).

Against the backdrop of these events, Arango y Parreño and other Cuban planters realized that they now had the opportunity to develop their island as a major plantation producer.  In 1793, for example, Arango y Parreño predicted that Cuban planters were about to enjoy a period of prosperity (Knight, p. 73).  In 1795 Arango y Parreño and another man named Ignacio Montalvo y Ambulodi, Count of Casa-Montalvo, traveled to England, Portugal, Barbados, and Jamaica.  The purpose of this tour was to collect information that could help Cuba to establish its sugar industry.

Arango y Parreno observed what he saw during his trip and took relevant notes.  With respect to the transatlantic slave trade, he noted that the English and Portuguese dominated the slave trade because they had trading posts on the African coast.  When he visited England he was impressed with the level of industrialization he saw there.  In particular, he noted the sugar refineries in that country.  British Caribbean sugar producers exported unrefined brown sugar (muscovado) to England, where the sugar was further refined in local factories.  Arango y Parreno believed that Cuba should refine its sugar on the island rather than exported muscovado brown sugar like the British West Indian planters did.  He sent models of the English factories back to Cuba.  This would be an important contribution to the Cuban sugar industry, because Cuba would produce refined sugar while the British West Indian planters continued to produce only less refined brown sugar.  This would give the Cuban sugar planters a major competitive advantage over their British Caribbean counterparts (Knight, p. 76).

When he visited Barbados and Jamaica, Arango y Parreño made detailed observations about the two British sugar island's sugarcane cultivation, sugar and rum production.  After his voyage, many other Cuban planters followed his example by making similar fact-finding tours of the British Caribbean sugar colonies.

Arango y Parreño played an important role in convincing Cuban planters to adopt the latest innovations in the sugar industry.  He helped to convince them to adopt new sugarcane varieties like Otaheiti, and new types of processing that used steam, water and wind power.  Cuba's rise as a major slave-based sugar producer came during an era when there was growing international agitation for the abolition of slavery.  Arango y Parreño argued that slavery would eventually have to be abolished, but argued that the emancipation process should be left in the hands of Cuban colonists rather than imperial authorities in Spain (Blackburn, p. 318).  In the 1790s Arango y Parreño helped to pioneer the establishment of a transatlantic slave trade to Cuba, operated by Cuban and Spanish merchants from the island of Fernando Po off the coast of West Africa (Blackburn, p. 393).  Then, in the 1820s, Arango y Parreño emerged as an opponent of the slave trade.  This change of position may have reflected Cuban planters' fears of growing numbers of African slaves and their distrust of slave traders who had close ties to Spanish colonial officials (Blackburn, p. 395).  He died on March 21, 1837.

References 
Robin Blackburn. The Overthrow of Colonial Slavery, 1776-1848 (1988).
Franklin Knight, "The Transformation of Cuban Agriculture 1763-1838", p. 69–79 in Hilary Beckles and Verene Shepherd (editors), Caribbean Slave Society and Economy: A Student Reader.  Kingston, Jamaica: Ian Randle Publishers Limited, 1991.
Stephan Palmié and Francisco A. Scarano (editors), The Caribbean: A History of the Region and Its Peoples.  Chicago: The University of Chicago Press, 2011.

Cuban politicians
1765 births
1837 deaths